K. Mithun Chamika Udayanga Perera (born 26 December 1986) is a Sri Lankan golfer. His father, Nandasena Perera, is also a notable golfer. 

As an amateur, Perera won the Sri Lanka Amateur three times as well as other Asian amateur events. He represented Sri Lanka in the 2006 and 2010 Asian Games and the 2010 South Asian Games.

Perera turned professional in 2011 and currently plays on the Professional Golf Tour of India and the Asian Tour. He is the first Sri Lankan to have full card in Asian Tour and the first Sri Lankan to have multiple wins on the Indian Tour. He has been runner-up three times on the Asian Tour; at the 2012 ISPS Handa Singapore Classic, the 2013 Zaykabar Myanmar Open and the 2014 Panasonic Open India, where he lost in a three-man playoff.

Amateur wins
2006 Sri Lanka Amateur
2007 SAARC Golf Championship, Eastern India Amateur
2008 Sri Lanka Amateur
2009 Asia-Pacific Open Amateur, Surya Nepal Amateur Golf Championship
2010 Kurnia Saujana Championship, Sri Lanka Amateur

Sources:

Professional wins (7)

Professional Golf Tour of India wins (7)

Playoff record
Asian Tour playoff record (0–1)

References

External links

Sri Lankan male golfers
Asian Tour golfers
Golfers at the 2006 Asian Games
Golfers at the 2010 Asian Games
Asian Games competitors for Sri Lanka
1986 births
Living people
20th-century Sri Lankan people
21st-century Sri Lankan people